Proprotein convertase 1, also known as prohormone convertase, prohormone convertase 3, or neuroendocrine convertase 1 and often abbreviated as PC1/3 is an enzyme that in humans is encoded by the PCSK1 gene. PCSK1 and PCSK2 differentially cleave proopiomelanocortin and they act together to process proinsulin and proglucagon in pancreatic islets.

Function 

PC1/3 is an enzyme that performs the proteolytic cleavage of prohormones to their intermediate (or sometimes completely cleaved) forms. It is present only in neuroendocrine cells such as brain, pituitary and adrenal, and most often cleaves after a pair of basic residues within prohormones but can occasionally cleave after a single arginine. It binds to a protein known as proSAAS, which also represents its endogenous inhibitor. PC1 is synthesized as a 99 kDa proform quickly converted to an 87 kDa major active form, which itself is nearly completely cleaved to a 66 kDa active form within neuroendocrine cells.

Proprotein convertase 1 is the enzyme largely responsible for the first step in the biosynthesis of insulin.  Following the action of proprotein convertase 1, a carboxypeptidase is required to remove the basic residues from the processing intermediate and generate the bioactive form of insulin.  Another prohormone convertase, proprotein convertase 2 plays a more minor role in the first step of insulin biosynthesis, but a greater role in the first step of glucagon biosynthesis. The knockout of proprotein convertase 1 is not lethal in mice or humans, most likely due to the presence of the second convertase, although mice lacking proprotein convertase 1 activity show a number of defects including slow growth.

Proprotein convertase 1 is a calcium (Ca2+) activated serine endoprotease (meaning that a serine residue is part of the active site that hydrolyzes the peptide bond within the substrate).  It is related to the bacterial enzyme known as subtilisin.  There are nine subtilisin homologs in mammals; in addition to proprotein convertase 1 and 2, other members of this enzyme family include furin, PACE4, PC4, PC5/6, PC7/8, PCSK9, and SKI1/S1P.

Proprotein convertase 1 converts prorenin into renin.

Clinical significance 

Variants in the PCSK1 gene may be associated with obesity.

See also 
Proprotein convertase subtilisin/kexin type 1 inhibitor

References

External links
 
 

EC 3.4.21